Swing High, Swing Low is a 1937 American romantic comedy drama film directed by Mitchell Leisen and starring Carole Lombard and Fred MacMurray.

It is the second film adaptation of the popular 1927 Broadway play Burlesque by George Manker Watters and Arthur Hopkins
(after The Dance of Life (1929) and before When My Baby Smiles at Me (1948)).

Plot
Working her way as a hairdresser on board a liner traveling through the Panama Canal Zone, Maggie King (Carole Lombard) brushes off a brash young soldier, "Skid" Johnson (Fred MacMurray), on his last day in the Army. However, he is persistent, and the next day she and her friend Ella reluctantly go on a double date with him and his piano player friend Harry (Charles Butterworth) in Balboa. In a nightclub, she expresses her distaste of trumpet music, whereupon he impresses her with his amazing prowess with the instrument. When a man (Anthony Quinn, speaking only Spanish) tries to pick her up at the bar, he and Skid end up brawling, which lands Skid and Maggie in jail. As a result, Maggie misses her ship back to the States.

With no money left after helping pay the fine, she is forced to move in with Skid and Harry. She talks a skeptical Murphy (a woman) into hiring the unambitious Skid and her as a trumpet player and showgirl, respectively, at "Murphy's Cafe y Bar" by telling Murphy that they are married. She clashes with fellow showgirl Anita Alvarez (Dorothy Lamour), Skid's former girlfriend, but Anita soon leaves for a better job. Maggie and Skid eventually fall in love and marry.

Maggie prods the reluctant Skid into going to New York City to play in a major nightclub, leaving her behind. She finds out afterward that Anita works there. He is a big success, teamed with songstress Anita. Fame and fortune go to his head. He neglects to send Maggie the fare to join him and does not answer her letters. Finally Maggie borrows the money from Murphy. Anita intercepts her telegram to Skid, telling him where to meet her boat. After waiting at the pier for a long time, Maggie calls Anita's hotel room on a hunch, and a drunk Skid answers (Anita invited him in for a nightcap after a night on the town together). Maggie divorces him. Ella finds out and tells her old boyfriend, wealthy rancher Harvey Howell. Mary plans to sail to France to obtain a divorce and marry Harvey.

Skid is so devastated, he starts drinking and missing performances, costing him his job and his career. Finally, he tries to reenlist, but fails the physical exam. Then, he runs into Harry, who has been searching for him. Harry has gotten a band together for a live radio performance to audition for an important sponsor and (to help his old friend out) wants Skid to play with them. Skid's old agent Georgie tries to get Maggie, just returned from France, to pull Skid into shape. She rushes over and does her best. During the broadcast, Skid is terrible at first, but after Maggie tells him that she is sticking to him "til death do us part", he recaptures his old brilliance.

Cast
 Carole Lombard as Maggie King
 Fred MacMurray as Skid Johnson
 Charles Butterworth as Harry
 Jean Dixon as Ella
 Dorothy Lamour as Anita Alvarez
 Harvey Stephens as Harvey Howell
 Cecil Cunningham as Murphy
 Charles Arnt as Georgie
 Franklin Pangborn as Henri
 Anthony Quinn as The Don
 Charles Judels as Tony

Production credits (other)
 Boris Morros - musical direction
 Al Siegel - vocal supervision
 Farciot Edouart - special photographic effects
 Earl Haman - sound recording
 Don Johnson - sound recording
 Travis Banton - costume design
 A. E. Freudeman - interior decorations
 Ernst Fegté - art director

Reception
Frank Nugent, critic for The New York Times, wrote "Swing High, Swing Low, like most Ferris wheels, doesn't go anywhere—at least, nowhere that you have not been. Its players really are worthy of better treatment."

Releases
In 1965, the film entered the public domain in the United States because the claimants did not renew its copyright registration in the 28th year after publication.

Swing High, Swing Low was released on DVD (all regions) by Synergy Entertainment on May 15, 2007.

References

External links

 
 
 
 
 
 

1937 films
1930s romantic comedy-drama films
American black-and-white films
American musical comedy-drama films
1930s musical comedy-drama films
American romantic musical films
1930s English-language films
American films based on plays
Films directed by Mitchell Leisen
Films set in New York City
Films set in Panama
Paramount Pictures films
1930s Spanish-language films
1930s romantic musical films
American romantic comedy-drama films
1937 comedy films
1930s American films